Fountainea is a genus of Neotropical leaf butterflies. Their wing undersides usually mimic dead leaves.

This genus honours Margaret Fountaine, a renowned entomologist.

Species
There are eight species in the genus:
 Fountainea centaurus (Felder & Felder, 1867)
 Fountainea eurypyle (C. & R. Felder, 1862) – pointed leafwing
 Fountainea glycerium (Doubleday, 1849) – angled leafwing
 Fountainea halice (Godart, 1824) – ruddy leafwing
 Fountainea nessus (Latreille, 1813) – superb leafwing
 Fountainea nobilis (Bates, 1864) – noble leafwing
 Fountainea ryphea (Cramer, 1775) – flamingo leafwing
 Fountainea sosippus (Hopffer, 1874)

References
 "Fountainea Rydon, 1971" at Markku Savela's Lepidoptera and Some Other Life Forms
 Biolib
Rydon, A.H.B. 1971. The systematics of the Charaxidae (Lepidoptera: Nymphaloidea). Entomologists Record 83: 219-233, 283-287, 310-316, 336-341, 384-388, 6 figs., 4 plates.

External links
 Pteron Images. In Japanese but with binomial names

 
Nymphalidae of South America
Nymphalidae genera